Shadh-Shapur was an Iranian king who ruled Spahan and its surroundings as a vassal of the Parthian Empire in the early 3rd-century. In 224, the Sasanian king Ardashir I seized the city and killed him.

Sources 
 
 

3rd-century Iranian people
224 deaths
Date of birth unknown
3rd-century monarchs in the Middle East
3rd-century deaths